B. Rajam Iyer (15 July 1922 – 3 May 2009) was a Carnatic singer from South India. He was awarded the Madras Music Academy's Sangeetha Kalanidhi in 1987.

Family
Rajam Iyer was born in Karaikudi, in Ramnad district. His father is Balasubramania Iyer and his mother is Lakshmi Ammal.

Training in music
He began his training in Carnatic music under Thirukokarnam Subbiah Bhagaathar and then under Ganapathy Iyer of Kunnakudi. The latter is a Gottuvadyam and Jalatarangam player. This initial training lasted for about five years.
He went for advanced training as the disciple of Ariyakudi Ramanuja Iyengar. This training was undertaken in the traditional Gurukula (residing in the master's residence and serving him) style and lasted for about 10 years.
Rajam Iyer grew up as the leading disciple of Ramanuja Iyengar and became an exponent of his style of singing.
His long association with Ramanuja Iyengar helped him to enrich his repertoire. In addition, he learnt Muthuswami Dikshitar krithis from T. L. Venkatarama Iyer, a recipient of the Prestigious Sangeetha Kalanidhi award.

As a musicologist
He set tunes and rhythm to all the 30 Tiruppaavai songs of Sri Andal. He also set tunes to many Rama Natakam songs of Arunachala Kavi. He published these and many other songs to which he set music.
He was a tutor to the Travancore royal family members for 4 years since 1943.
He served as a member of the selection panels of Madras and Delhi universities. He was a member of the expert committee of the Madras Music Academy
Perhaps his greatest achievement was bringing out the Tamil edition of Sangita Sampradaya Pradarshini written by Subbarama Dikshitar. This was done for the Madras Music Academy.

Concerts
His first concert was during the Thyagaraja Aradhana at Thiruvaiyaru in 1942. He gave his first performance in Chennai (it was called Madras, then) in 1956 with a concert in the Jagannadha Sabha in Egmore. He renders the compositions with sincerity and devotion. His concerts are noted for the sustained interest they acquire from the tana varna to the lighter pieces bringing out the excellence in composition and musical content.
He had also served as the "Top Grade Artiste" of All India Radio.

Publishing of notations of Sri Muthuswami Dikshitar in Swadesamitran
Sangita Kalanidhi Sri B. Rajam Iyer was a living authority in rendering Shri Muthuswami Dikshitar’s kritis.  He had the benefit of learning these kritis under the tutelage of Shri T.L.Venkatarama Iyer, who himself had the privilege of learning them from Shri Ambi Dikshitar.  Shri Rajam Iyer wrote swara notations to several Dikshitar’s compositions and these were published in Swadesamitran, Tamil weekly in 1956.  He was fired by a grand ambition — to share and propagate the glories of the Dikshitar heritage.  The swara knowledge fostered by his first Guru Sri Kunnakudi Ganapathi Iyer, a Gottuvadyam and a Jalatharangam artiste was a blessing as Dikshitar’s compositions demanded meticulous expertise in the notation process, as evident in Rajam Iyer’s “Selected Compositions of Sri Muttusvami Dikshitar” (2004) published in Roman and Devanagari scripts, or in his contributions as co-editor of Subbarama Dikshitar’s “Sampradaya Pradarsini.”The original Pataantaram (repertoire) of the great composers’ kritis were reflected in the notations.

He once visited Arsha Vidya Gurukulam, Saylorsburg, Pennysylvana, in August 2003, to conduct a weeklong camp on Dikshitar Kritis in the presence of Pujya Swamiji Dayananda Saraswathi.  One of his students Subbalakshmi Chandrasekaran was fortunate to learn a few kritis taught by Shri B. Rajam Iyer and was inspired by the method by which very difficult kritis were taught with ease.  She undertook the project of translating the original notations of the kritis in English, for the benefit of the music students all over the world who may not be able to read Tamil. The notations were in English and the sahitya were written following the international scheme of Transliteration.  The kritis were written in Devanagiri as well as in Romanised English fonts.  The book was published in the year October 2004.

Awards and honours
Kalaimamani, 1981 by Tamil Nadu State Government
Swar Vilas, 1981 by Sur singer Samsad, Mumbai
Certificate of Merit and T.T.K. Memorial Award, 1984, the Music Academy
Government of India Senior Fellowship, 1984-86
The T.T.K Trust Award for Meritorious Musicians, 1985, The Music Academy, Chennai, FiftyEighth Conference
Dr. Raja Sir Annamalai Chettiar Memorial Award for Talented Musicians, 1986, The Music Academy, Chennai, Fiftyninth Conference
Sangeetha Kalasikhamani, 1985 by The Indian Fine Arts Society
Sangeet Natak Akademi Award in 1986 by Sangeet Natak Akademi
Sangeetha Kalanidhi, 1987 by Music Academy, Chennai
Guruguhanjali Award, 1997, Guruguhanjali Trust of Dr.V.V. Srivatsa
Kala Ratna, 2000, Rasikaranjani Sabha, Chennai
Sangeetha Kala Sironmani, 2000, Nungambakkam Cultural Academy, Chennai
Sangeetha Acharya, 2001, Narada Gana Sabha
Gayakaratnam, 2002, Sri Swati Tirunal Sangita Sabha, Trivandrum
Padma Bhushan, 2003 by the Government of India
Kalai Chudar, 2003, Palani Tamil Sangam Sabha
Sangeetha Kala Sagara, 2004, Thyagaraja Festival of Cleveland, USA
Honorary Doctorate, 2004, University of Madras
Nadha yogi, 2004, Sri Parthasarathy Swamy Sabha, Chennai
Contributions to Sangita Sampradaya Pradarshini, 2005, Music Academy, Chennai at the 78th Annual Conference on 4 January 2005
Gayaka Sikhamani, 2006, Sanskrit College Chennai
Veteran Award, 2006, Bharat Kalachar
Sangeetha Seva Nirata, 2006, Sri Thyagaraja Sangeetha Vidwath Samajam
Arsha Kala Bhushanam, 2008, Dayananda Swamiji

Personal life
He had 5 daughters. His fifth daughter Gowri Venkataraman learnt music from him and accompanied him for concerts. His second son-in-law Sri V.Subramanian and grand daughter Dr.S.Seethalakshmi learnt music from him and accompanied him for concerts in India and abroad.

Prominent students
Smt. Vaijayanthi Mala Bali, Hon’ble Chief Minister Dr.J. Jayalalitha, Mallika Sivasailam (TAFE group), N Veera Raghavan, Padmavathy (IAS), Dr.Prameela Gurumurthy, Jayanthi Ravi (IAS), Chandrika Rajaraman, Namagiri Ramesh, Rajini Hariharan, Kalki group Smt. Anandhi, Prakash, Dr. Gowri Ramanarayan, his (Rajam Iyer's) fifth daughter Gowri Venkataraman, TVS group Sheela Balaji, Mallika Srinivasan, Gayathri Mahesh, Jayalakshmi Santhanam, Padma Sandilyan, Rama Ravi, Sirigudi Sisters, Prof. Unnikrishnan, V.K.Manimaran, Rajini Hariharan, Namagiri Ramesh, Kasthuri Shiv kumar Bhat and Dr.Shiv kumar Bhat

Foreign Students
Prof. David Reck, Prof. Skelton, Sri Swaminathan Natarajan, Smt. Sivasakthi Sivanesan (London) and Sri Y.Yadavan (London).

Death
B. Rajam Iyer died on Sunday 3 May 2009 (aged 86) after a brief illness.

References

Notes

2009 deaths
1922 births
Recipients of the Padma Bhushan in arts
Male Carnatic singers
Carnatic singers
20th-century Indian male classical singers
Recipients of the Sangeet Natak Akademi Award